Spalam się (Polish I'm burning up) is the first solo album of Polish musician Kazik. It is the first hip hop style album in Polish rock music history. It was released on CD and compact cassette.

Songs 
 Nowy konflikt światowy (The New Global Conflict)
 Dziewczyny (Girls)
 Piosenka trepa (Soldier's Song)
 Cyrk (Circus)
 Jeszcze Polska... (Poland Is Not Yet...)
 Bagdad
 Spalam się (I'm Burning)
 Świadomość (Consciousness/Awareness)
 Oblężenie (The Siege)
 Temat z filmu "Bagaż nielegalny" (Theme from the film "Illegal Baggage")
 Dziewczyny (hard version)CD
 Nie mogę istnieć bez narzekaniaCD (I Cannot Exist Without Complaining)
 Spalam się (long version)CD

CD – only on CD, Zic-Zac label 0009

Credits 
 Kazik Staszewski – Voices, Sampler, saxophone
 Jacek Kufirski – Keyboard, Strings, Sampler, Bass, Drum Programming, Voices
  – Keyboards, Sampler, Strings, Conga, Voices, Drum Programming
  – Recordings, Sampler, Voice
 Wojciech Waglewski – Guitar
  – Saxophone
 Paweł Betley – Piano
  – Voice

Kazik Staszewski albums
1991 debut albums